This is a list of inorganic and organic reagents commonly used in chemistry.

Synopsis
Reagents are "substances or compounds that are added to a system in order to bring about a chemical reaction or are added to see if a reaction occurs."  Some reagents are just a single element.  However, most processes require reagents made of chemical compounds.  Some of the most common ones used widely for specific reactive functions are listed below, but is by no means exhaustive.

Reagent Compounds

See also
 Reagent
 Limiting reagent
 :Category: Reagents for organic chemistry

References 

Reagents
Reagents for organic chemistry